Martin's Mill Covered Bridge is a public, historic wooden covered bridge located at Antrim Township in Franklin County, Pennsylvania. Martins Mill has dawn to dusk hours of 8 AM - PM. It crosses Conococheague Creek.

It was listed on the National Register of Historic Places in 1974.

Gallery

References 

Covered bridges on the National Register of Historic Places in Pennsylvania
Covered bridges in Franklin County, Pennsylvania
Bridges completed in 1849
Wooden bridges in Pennsylvania
Bridges in Franklin County, Pennsylvania
1849 establishments in Pennsylvania
National Register of Historic Places in Franklin County, Pennsylvania
Road bridges on the National Register of Historic Places in Pennsylvania
Lattice truss bridges in the United States